Edward Reginald Noble (June 23, 1896 – January 19, 1962) was a Canadian professional ice hockey forward and defenceman who played 17 professional seasons in the National Hockey Association (NHA) and National Hockey League (NHL) for the Toronto Blueshirts, Montreal Canadiens, Toronto St. Pats, Montreal Maroons, Detroit Cougars, Detroit Falcons and Detroit Red Wings between 1916 and 1933. He was a three-time winner of the Stanley Cup, with Toronto and Montreal and was inducted into the Hockey Hall of Fame in 1962. He was also the last active player from the NHL's inaugural season, the NHA and the 1910s.

Playing career
Prior to turning professional Noble enlisted in February 1916 with the 180th Battalion (Sportsmen) to serve in the First World War. However he was medically discharged in September that year due to previous foot injury (a tendon in his right foot had previously been cut) which prevented him from marching for long periods, and did not go overseas.

Noble started his professional career with the Toronto Blueshirts during the 1916–17. The club was suspended by the league and he was assigned by the league to the Montreal Canadiens for the rest of the season. The following year, the new NHL assigned the Toronto franchise to the Toronto Arena owners and Noble signed with the team. The Blueshirts, despite the ownership difficulty and several personnel changes, won the NHL title and defeated Vancouver for the Stanley Cup championship. Noble would stay with the franchise as it became the Arenas, and later the St. Pats, until he was traded to the Montreal Maroons in the 1924–25 season. The St. Pats would win the Stanley Cup again in 1922, a season where Noble was playing coach and captain. One season after joining the Maroons, the Maroons themselves would win the Stanley Cup in 1926. In 1927, he was traded to the new Detroit franchise in the NHL, then named the Falcons. He would play for the franchise for six seasons, eventually returning by trade to the Maroons in 1932–33. He retired with 181 goals in 536 games in the NHA and NHL. 

After retiring Noble worked as a referee in the NHL between 1937 and 1939. He was inducted posthumously into the Hall of Fame in 1962.

Career statistics

Regular season and playoffs

Awards and achievements
 1914–15 –  OHA-Jr. First All-Star Team
 1918 – Stanley Cup championship (Toronto Arenas)
 1922 – Stanley Cup championship (Toronto St. Pats)
 1926 – Stanley Cup championship (Montreal Maroons)
 1962 – Inducted into the Hockey Hall of Fame

Transactions
 November 25, 1916 – signed as a free agent by Toronto (NHA)
 February 11, 1917 – assigned to Montreal Canadiens (NHA) by NHA in dispersal of Toronto (NHA) players
 December 5, 1917 – signed as a free agent by Toronto (NHL)
 November 1, 1921 – named player coach of Toronto (NHL).
 November 1, 1922 – resigned as coach and captain of Toronto (NHL)
 December 9, 1924 – traded to Montreal Maroons by Toronto for $8,000.
 October 4, 1927 – traded to Detroit by Montreal Maroons for $7,500.
 December 9, 1932 – traded to Montreal Maroons by Detroit for John Gallagher.
Source:

References

Bibliography

External links
 

1896 births
1962 deaths
Canadian ice hockey centres
Detroit Cougars players
Detroit Falcons players
Detroit Red Wings captains
Detroit Red Wings players
Hockey Hall of Fame inductees
Ice hockey people from Simcoe County
Montreal Canadiens (NHA) players
Montreal Maroons players
Ontario Hockey Association Senior A League (1890–1979) players
Sportspeople from Collingwood, Ontario
Stanley Cup champions
Toronto Arenas players
Toronto Blueshirts players
Toronto St. Michael's Majors players
Toronto St. Pats players